Leila Ebrahimi Mojaveri (born 21 April 1979, in Tehran) is an Iranian retired middle distance runner.

She started running at the age 16 in 2001. She finished tenth in the 1500 metres at the 2006 Asian Games and won the bronze medal in the 3000 metres steeplechase at the 2007 Asian Championships.

She hold Iran's national records in 1500 meters and 3000 meters in outdoor and indoor.

References

1979 births
Living people
Iranian female middle-distance runners
Iranian female steeplechase runners
Athletes (track and field) at the 2006 Asian Games
Athletes (track and field) at the 2010 Asian Games
Asian Games competitors for Iran